The 1988 VFL Grand Final was an Australian rules football game contested between the  Hawthorn Football Club and the Melbourne Football Club, held at the Melbourne Cricket Ground in Melbourne on 24 September 1988. It was the 92nd annual Grand Final of the Victorian Football League, staged to determine the premiers for the 1988 VFL season. The match, attended by 93,754 spectators, was won by Hawthorn by a margin of 96 points, marking that club's seventh premiership victory.

Background

It was Hawthorn's sixth successive Grand Final appearance, while Melbourne were competing in its first since winning the 1964 VFL Grand Final.

At the conclusion of the home and away season, Hawthorn had finished first on the VFL ladder with 19 wins and 3 losses. Melbourne had finished fifth with 13 wins and 9 losses. In the two meetings between the teams in the regular season, Melbourne defeated Hawthorn by 21 points in round 7, while the Hawks beat the Demons by 69 points in round 17.

In the finals series leading up to the Grand Final, Melbourne defeated West Coast by just two points in the Elimination Final, then defeated Collingwood by 13 points in the First Semi-Final and Carlton by 22 points in the Preliminary Final. Hawthorn had a much easier finals run, winning the Second Semi-Final over Carlton by 21 points to advance straight to the Grand Final, thus having played only one game in the four weeks preceding the Grand Final.

Match summary

Chris Wittman broke his arm early in the game and played no further part. The game was fairly competitive for the first quarter, then Hawthorn completely dominated the game, setting a VFL record for the greatest winning margin in a Grand Final, beating the record it had itself set in the 1983 VFL Grand Final. This margin remained a record until Geelong's 119-point defeat of Port Adelaide in the 2007 AFL Grand Final. Jason Dunstall kicked 7 goals, Paul Abbott kicked 6 goals and Dermott Brereton kicked 5 goals for the Hawks. 

Melbourne's loss would be followed up by another severe Grand Final loss in 2000, 12 years later, to the tune of 60 points at the hands of Essendon. It wouldn't be until 2021 that Melbourne would break its 57-year Grand Final drought against the Western Bulldogs by a 74-point margin. 

The Norm Smith Medal was awarded to Hawthorn defender Gary Ayres for being judged the best player afield, with 22 disposals despite sustaining a fractured cheek bone in the first quarter. Ayres nullified dangerous Melbourne player Greg Healy and set up many of the Hawks attacks from the defensive line. Jim Stynes was voted best on ground for the Demons.

Hawks coach Alan Joyce, who replaced an ill Allan Jeans for the 1988 season, said: "I have never seen a more awesome, more inspiring passage of play than the 15-minute mark of the second quarter. I saw about a dozen Hawthorn players in a wave going down the field. It was a human chain, crashing through a desperate opposition and forcing the ball forward."

In a lesser-known streaker incident, a woman ran completely naked across the ground during the last quarter and was promptly arrested.

Teams

Goal kickers

References

External links
Match details at AFL Tables

See also
 1988 VFL season

VFL/AFL Grand Finals
Vfl Grand Final, 1988
Hawthorn Football Club
Melbourne Football Club